Stan Smith defeated Jan Kodeš in the final, 3–6, 6–3, 6–2, 7–6(5–3) to win the men's singles tennis title at the 1971 US Open.

Ken Rosewall was the defending champion, but did not compete.

Rosewall and Tony Roche, both finalists from the previous year, did not compete in the tournament this year. This would not happen again at the US Open until the 2017 edition of the tournament, 46 years later.

Seeds
The seeded players are listed below. Stan Smith is the champion; others show the round in which they were eliminated.

 John Newcombe (first round)
 Stan Smith (champion)
 Arthur Ashe (semifinalist)
 Tom Okker (semifinalist)
 Marty Riessen (quarterfinalist)
 Cliff Richey (third round)
 Clark Graebner (quarterfinalist)
 Ilie Năstase (third round)

Draw

Key
 Q = Qualifier
 WC = Wild card
 LL = Lucky loser
 r = Retired

Final eight

Section 1

Section 2

Section 3

Section 4

Section 5

Section 6

Section 7

Section 8

External links
 Association of Tennis Professionals (ATP) – 1971 US Open Men's Singles draw
1971 US Open – Men's draws and results at the International Tennis Federation

Men's singles
US Open (tennis) by year – Men's singles